Jacob Gross (February 11, 1840 – December 29, 1918) was a German American businessman and politician.

Born in Germany, Gross emigrated to the United States in 1860 and settled in Chicago, Illinois. He went to the Chicago public schools and was a tinsmith. He was also a store clerk. Gross served in the 82nd Illinois Volunteer Infantry Regiment and was wounded in his leg which had to be amputated. After the civil war, Gross served in public office including police court clerk and Clerk of the Circuit Court of Cook County . From 1885 to 1887, Gross served as Illinois State Treasurer. He then was involved in the bank business. Gross died at his home in Chicago, Illinois.

Notes

External links

1840 births
1918 deaths
German emigrants to the United States
People of Illinois in the American Civil War
Politicians from Chicago
Businesspeople from Chicago
State treasurers of Illinois
19th-century American businesspeople